Lower Parel is a monorail station of Mumbai Monorail located in the Lower Parel suburb of Mumbai, India. Lies on the NM Joshi Marg. It lies to the West of Lalbaug area of South Central Mumbai.

Lower Parel monorail station connects with  railway station with the length of 350m far and with  railway station is of 300m far.

References

Mumbai Monorail stations
Railway stations in India opened in 2019